Santa Clarita is a city in northwestern Los Angeles County, California, United States.

Santa Clarita may also refer to:
 Santa Clarita Valley
 Santa Clarita station

See also

Clarita (disambiguation)
Santa Clara (disambiguation)
Santa Clarita Diet, an American web TV series